Tarmo Kink (born 6 October 1985) is an Estonian former footballer who played as a winger. He last worked as a sporting director at Levadia.

Club career

Early career
In 2001, Kink started his career with S.C. Real, scoring 46 goals in 15 games. In 2001, Kink spent a short loan spell with Viimsi. He scored 31 goals in just 6 games, including 9 goals in a single match against Sillamäe Kalev. He spent the 2002 Meistriliiga season on loan at the Meistriliiga club Narva Trans, where he made 24 appearances, mostly as a substitute.

Spartak Moscow
In 2003, at the age of 17, Kink signed a five-year contract with the Russian Premier League club Spartak Moscow. Kink made his debut for Spartak Moscow on 6 February 2003, against Shchyolkovo in a friendly match. He played his first Russian Premier League match on 23 August 2003, in a 2–0 defeat against Rubin Kazan. Kink mostly played for Spartak Moscow's reserves in Russia, although he did make two league appearances, as well as coming on as a substitute in a UEFA Cup third round defeat to Mallorca. In 2006, after failing to break into the first team, Kink returned to Estonia.

Levadia
On 6 July 2006, Kink signed a two-year contract with Meistriliiga club Levadia. Three days later, Kink played his first Meistriliiga game for Levadia in a derby against Flora. He scored his first Meistriliiga goal for Levadia on 23 July 2006, in a 3–1 victory over TVMK. On 8 March 2008, Kink extended his current contract with Levadia until 30 November 2009. On 28 July 2008, he was close to signing a three-year contract with Romanian Liga I club Gloria Buzău for a fee of €200,000, but rejected the offer, because he didn't find the conditions in Romania suitable. On 29 July 2008, it was reported that Kink would go on trial to Dutch club De Graafschap. However he did not get a chance to impress, picking up a knee injury just five minutes into his first training session with the club and returned to Estonia.

Győr
In January 2009, Kink signed a three-and-a-half-year contract with Hungarian side Győr. He scored 3 goals in 12 matches in his first season in Hungary. Kink finished the 2009–10 Nemzeti Bajnokság I as the club's top scorer with 12 goals from 28 matches. He also scored 3 goals in 2 matches against Slovakian side Nitra in the qualifying phase of the 2010–11 UEFA Europa League.

Middlesbrough
On 27 July 2010, Kink signed a three-year contract with English Championship side Middlesbrough for a reported transfer fee of £850,000. Kink made his debut on 7 August 2010, replacing Justin Hoyte on the 60th minute of the 1–3 league defeat to Ipswich Town. Kink scored his first goal on 14 September 2010, against Burnley, coming off the bench in the 75th minute. His second goal followed in the 94th minute from a 30-yard freekick smashed into the top left corner; the game finished 2–1 to Middlesbrough. On 6 November 2010, he scored in his club's 2–1 win over Crystal Palace. After a few months without playing, Kink was chosen to play against Ipswich Town. After that he made several substitute appearances, including one against Coventry City on 25 April, in which he scored a 92nd-minute winner. Throughout his time with Middlesbrough, Kink struggled for first team football. In February 2012, Kink and Middlesbrough decided to terminate his contract, making him a free agent.

Karpaty Lviv
In February 2012, Kink signed a contract with Ukrainian side Karpaty Lviv, which was supposed to last until the end of the season in May, but was terminated in April 2012.

Varese
In August 2012, Kink signed with Italian Serie B club Varese.

Return to Győr
In January 2013, Kink returned to Győr on a one-year loan spell from Varese in search of more playing time.

Inverness Caledonian Thistle
In March 2015, Kink signed for Scottish Premiership club Inverness Caledonian Thistle until the end of the season. He made his debut later that month, coming on as a substitute in a Scottish Cup game against Raith Rovers. He made his league debut coming off the bench in a match against Partick Thistle. Kink was an unused substitute in the 2015 Scottish Cup Final Inverness won.

Return to Levadia (2015)
On 8 July 2015, Kink returned to his former club Levadia.

SJK
In January 2016, Kink signed a contract with Finnish champion side SJK for the 2016 season.

Mezőkövesd
In July 2016, Kink left SJK and signed for Hungarian club Mezőkövesd.

Return to Levadia (2017)
On 9 August 2017, Kink once again rejoined his former club Levadia. After the season end in autumn, when Levadia merged with FCI, he left the club and had an operation in December, being free agent since.

Retirement
Since retiring from playing, Kink has been sporting director of Levadia.

International career
Kink made his Estonia national football team debut on 31 March 2004 against Northern Ireland in a friendly match. He scored his first national team goal from a penalty on 27 May 2008, in a 1–1 draw against Georgia. Eight days later Kink scored his second goal for Estonia against Faroe Islands in another friendly match.
On 8 October 2010, Kink scored from a beautiful long range effort in a UEFA Euro 2012 qualifying match against Serbia, equalizing the game at 1–1 in the 63rd minute as Estonia went on to win 3–1.

Career statistics

Club

International

International goals
Estonia score listed first, score column indicates score after each Kink goal.

Honours

Club
Levadia
Meistriliiga: 2006, 2007, 2008
Estonian Cup: 2006–07

Győr
Nemzeti Bajnokság I: 2012–13
Szuperkupa: 2013

Inverness Caledonian Thistle
Scottish Cup: 2014–15

Individual
Estonian Silverball: 2010

References

External links

1985 births
Living people
Footballers from Tallinn
Estonian footballers
Association football forwards
Estonia international footballers
JK Narva Trans players
FC Spartak Moscow players
FCI Levadia Tallinn players
Győri ETO FC players
Middlesbrough F.C. players
FC Karpaty Lviv players
S.S.D. Varese Calcio players
Kaposvári Rákóczi FC players
Inverness Caledonian Thistle F.C. players
Meistriliiga players
Russian Premier League players
English Football League players
Nemzeti Bajnokság I players
Ukrainian Premier League players
Serie B players
Esiliiga players
Estonian expatriate footballers
Expatriate footballers in Russia
Estonian expatriate sportspeople in Russia
Expatriate footballers in Hungary
Estonian expatriate sportspeople in Hungary
Expatriate footballers in England
Estonian expatriate sportspeople in England
Expatriate footballers in Ukraine
Estonian expatriate sportspeople in Ukraine
Expatriate footballers in Italy
Estonian expatriate sportspeople in Italy
Expatriate footballers in Scotland
Estonian expatriate sportspeople in Scotland